Roman Dmytrijev (born 19 January 1995) is a Czech swimmer. He competed in the men's 200 metre backstroke event at the 2017 World Aquatics Championships.

References

1995 births
Living people
Czech male swimmers
Place of birth missing (living people)
Male backstroke swimmers